Marion is an Australian television drama which first screened on the ABC in 1974. It was scripted by Cliff Green, who drew on his experiences as a young country school teacher.

Cast
 Helen Morse as Marion Richards
 Tony Bonner
 John Clayton
 John Frawley
 Elspeth Ballantyne
 Marty Fields as Stinker
 Maurie Fields as Harry Richardson
 Graeme Blundell
 Kerry Armstrong
 Peter Aanensen  
 Kathy Beck
 Kerry Dwyer
 Martin Foot
 Wayne Latimer
 Joan Letch 
 Terry McDermott
 Paul Petrie
 Frank Wilson
 David Wiltshire

References

External links
Marion at Classic Australian TV
Marion at IMDb

Australian Broadcasting Corporation original programming
1974 Australian television series debuts
Australian drama television series
English-language television shows